Saint Abraham the Great of Kidunja (or Kidunaja) (died c. 366) was a 4th-century hermit and priest. He is venerated as a saint in Catholicism, Eastern Orthodoxy and Oriental Orthodoxy.

Biography
The Vita of St. Abraham was written by his friend, St. Ephrem.

Abraham was born to a wealthy family near Edessa, during the third century. After receiving an excellent education, Abraham was encouraged to get married. He followed the wishes of his parents, but shortly before the wedding ceremony, he told his bride his desire to dedicate his life to God.<ref name=oxford>[http://www.oxfordreference.com/view/10.1093/oi/authority.20110803095344611 "Abraham Kidunaia", Oxford Dictionary of Saints]</ref> His bride accepted this resolution and Abraham retired to a cell near the city, where he walled up the cell door, leaving only a small window open for food to be brought him.

Ten years after he retreated from the world, his parents died, leaving Abraham a wealthy man. He had the inheritance distributed to the poor. Abraham became known throughout the region as a holy man and many came to him for guidance. Reports of his reputation came to the Bishop of Edessa who ordained him a priest and sent Abraham to Beth-Kidunaa. When Abraham destroyed the pagan idols and altars, the outraged townspeople drove him away. Abraham would return and urge them to give up their superstitions, and be driven out again. Eventually his persistence began to yield results.

Abraham worked among them for the three years, when fearing that he would begin to desire material possessions he returned to his cell near Edessa where he spent the next fifty years in prayer and penance. He was known never to reprove anyone sharply but always with charity and gentleness.

Around the year 360 Abraham died at the age of seventy after a long life of service to God.

Legend
A popular story recounts that his orphan niece Mary had been entrusted to his care. He built a cell near his own and trained her in learning and piety until she was twenty. At this point, seduced by a false monk, she ran away ashamed and went to Troad, where she wound up a prostitute. For two years he lamented her departure not knowing what happened. When he finally learned where she was, he boldly went and recovered her.

Veneration
The feast day of Saint Abraham is October 29 in the Eastern Orthodox Church and in the Roman Catholic Church. The Syriac Catholic Church commemorates him on December 14, the Coptic Church on July 29, the Syriac Orthodox Church on October 24.

See also
 Anchorite
 Abramius the Recluse

References

External links
The Life of Saint Abraham, Hermit, by S. Ephraem the Deacon
Holweck, F. G. A Biographical Dictionary of the Saints''. St. Louis, MO: B. Herder Book Co. 1924.

3rd-century births
Year of birth missing
360s deaths
4th-century Christian clergy
Saints from Roman Anatolia
4th-century Christian saints
Hermits in the Roman Empire
People from Edessa